The 2014 Women's Oceania Handball Challenge Trophy was held at the ASB Sports Centre in Wellington, New Zealand between December 8 and 13, 2014.

The competition participants were defending champions Australia, host New Zealand, regulars Vanuatu and Cook Islands. New to the championship were America Samoa, New Caledonia, and Samoa.

Hosts New Zealand were the winner upsetting Australia in the final and going through undefeated. Third was New Caledonia over Vanuatu. Fifth was Cook Islands, then Samoa and America Samoa.

Women's results

Pool A

Pool B

5th to 7th place
Each team to play each other once. Round robin rounds and additional games to finalize positions.

Semi finals

Third place game

Final

Rankings

References

 2014 Introduction
 2014 Schedule
 2014 matches on YouTube
 Day 1 results
 Day 2 results
 Day 3 results
 Day 4 results
 Day 5 results
 Day 6 results
 Official results - IHF

Oceania Handball Challenge Trophy
Oceania Handball Challenge Trophy
Oceania Handball Challenge Trophy
Handball Challenge Trophy
Women's sports in Oceania